Novyi Bykiv is a village in Nizhyn Raion of Chernihiv Oblast (province) of Ukraine. It belongs to Nova Basan rural hromada, one of the hromadas of Ukraine. Population is 2,024 (2006).

History 
The earliest known references on Novyi Bykiv is of 1621. The mounds of the Bronze Age (II millennium B.C.) and Gord of Kievan Rus' (11th century) were found near the village.

Until 18 July 2020, Novyi Bykiv belonged to Bobrovytsia Raion. The raion was abolished in July 2020 as part of the administrative reform of Ukraine, which reduced the number of raions of Chernihiv Oblast to five. The area of Bobrovytsia Raion was merged into Nizhyn Raion.

In 2022, during the Russian invasion of Ukraine, the village was occupied from February 26 to March 31. Russian military personnel committed a number of war crimes in the village: prohibition of people to move freely around the village, prohibition to bury the dead relatives in the cemetery, numerous cases of looting (robbery of shops and the population), destruction of housing and infrastructure (the school, hospital, kindergarten, filling station were destroyed or damaged), killing of at least three civilians, illegal capture of civilians. Victoria Andrusha (one of the two illegally captured persons) was released from captivity by exchange on September 29, 2022.

Gallery

References

Sources
''"Историко-статистическое описаніе Черниговской епархіи. Книга пятая. Губ. городъ Черниговъ. Уѣзды: Черниговскій, Козелецкій, Суражскій, Кролевецкій и Остерский. — Черниговъ, Земская типографія, 1874. — С. 254-256."
 Быковъ // Черниговскія Епархіальныя извѣстія. — 1872. Прибавленія. — с. 151—154 (№ 8, 15 апрѣля).

Kozeletsky Uyezd
Villages in Nizhyn Raion